Arbis (Gascon: Arbís) is a former commune in the Gironde department in southwestern France. On 1 January 2019, it was merged into the new commune Porte-de-Benauge.

Population

See also
Communes of the Gironde department

References

Former communes of Gironde